Pseudochrobactrum lubricantis is a Gram-negative, oxidase-positive, non-spore-forming, rod-shaped, nonmotile bacterium of the genus Paenochrobactrum, which was isolated from water mixed metal-working fluid in Germany.

References

External links
Type strain of Pseudochrobactrum lubricantis at BacDive -  the Bacterial Diversity Metadatabase

Hyphomicrobiales
Bacteria described in 2009